John Prentice (2 August 1926 – 10 February 2006) was a Scottish football player and manager. He played for Heart of Midlothian, Rangers, Falkirk and Dumbarton, and managed Arbroath, Falkirk, Dundee, Clyde and Scotland.

Club career
Prentice was born in Shotts, Lanarkshire. After playing for the non-league club Carluke Rovers, Prentice signed for Hearts in 1944. A defender, he played for the Edinburgh side for seven years, before signing for Rangers in 1951 for £7000. He joined Falkirk in 1956 and the high point of his playing career was captaining Falkirk to their Scottish Cup triumph over Kilmarnock in the 1957 Scottish Cup Final. He left Falkirk in 1959 and signed for Dumbarton, where he finished his playing career. He also played for the Scottish League representative team.

Managerial career

Arbroath
Prentice began his managerial career at the age of 33 in April 1960, when he was appointed as manager of relegated First Division side Arbroath and took up his post for the final two games of the 1959–60 season. In his first full season (1960–61), Arbroath finished in 12th place in the 19 team Second Division after he had controversially sold top striker Dave Easson to Raith Rovers. In his second season, after a good start to the season, they finished in 6th place. Prentice suddenly resigned as manager in September 1962. No official reason was given for his exit, but a few weeks before his departure, Arbroath Town Council had refused to allocate him a house on the grounds that his job was not considered to be that of a 'key worker'.

Clyde
In November 1962, he was appointed as manager of Clyde. In his first half-season he was unable to stop Clyde being relegated, but in 1964 he guided them to promotion as Second Division runners-up. In the 1964–65 season Clyde finished seventh in the eighteen team First Division and also played well in the following season.

Scotland National Team
The quality of his team's performances and his management talents were recognized when, in March 1966, he was appointed as full-time manager of the Scotland national football team. He succeeded Jock Stein, who had managed the side on a part-time basis in addition to his post at Celtic. Prentice took charge of four games between April and June in 1966, all played at Hampden Park. Scotland suffered defeats by England, the Netherlands and Portugal, but recorded a 1–1 draw with reigning world champions Brazil in his last game. This meant that Prentice statistically held the worst record of any Scotland manager in his first four matches in charge, until Berti Vogts lost his first five matches in charge.

Later Club career
Prentice returned to club management with his old club Falkirk in October 1966. He later managed Dundee, his only experience of managing in European competition but left in 1972 to return to Falkirk where he remained until 1975.

Retirement
Prentice emigrated to Australia in the 1970s. He died in February 2006 of a brain tumour, aged 79.

Honours

Player
Rangers
Scottish Football League : 1952–53, 1955–56
Scottish Cup : 1952–53

Falkirk
Scottish Cup : 1956–57

Manager
Clyde
Scottish Second Division promotion: 1963–64

Dundee
Forfarshire Cup : 1970-71

Falkirk
Stirlingshire Cup : 1966–67, 1967–68
Scottish Second Division : 1974–75

Managerial statistics

References

External links

1926 births
2006 deaths
Sportspeople from Shotts
Deaths from cancer in New South Wales
Deaths from brain tumor
Scottish footballers
Rangers F.C. players
Heart of Midlothian F.C. players
Falkirk F.C. players
Dumbarton F.C. players
Scottish football managers
Scotland national football team managers
Arbroath F.C. managers
Falkirk F.C. managers
Clyde F.C. managers
Dundee F.C. managers
Carluke Rovers F.C. players
Scottish Football League players
Scottish Football League representative players
Scottish expatriates in Australia
Scottish Football League managers
Association football wing halves
Footballers from North Lanarkshire